The Toys of Men is the 27th studio album by jazz fusion bassist Stanley Clarke. It was released on October 16, 2007 via Heads Up International.

Track listing
All tracks composed by Stanley Clarke; except where noted. Tracks 4, 6, 10, 11 and 13 are solos by Stanley Clarke on acoustic bass.
 "The Toys of Men" – 11:14
 "Come On" (Ronald Bruner Jr., Stanley Clarke, Ruslan Sirota, Mads Tolling) – 2:59
 "Jerusalem" (Ruslan Sirota) – 6:13
 "Back in the Woods" – 1:24
 "All Over Again" (Stanley Clarke, Esperanza Spalding) – 5:04
 "Hmm Hmm" – 1:53
 "Bad Asses" – 5:04
 "Game" – 3:18
 "La Cancion de Sofia" – 3:07
 "El Bajo Negro" – 7:45
 "Broski" – 1:56
 "Châteauvallon 1972 (dedicated to Tony Williams)" – 5:25
 "Bass Folk Song No. 6" – 2:52

Personnel
Musicians
 Stanley Clarke – acoustic and electric bass, piccolo bass, tenor bass, spoken word
 Mads Tolling – violin (tracks 1, 2, 9)
 Jef Lee Johnson – electric guitar (tracks 1, 2, 8)
 Tomer Shtein – acoustic guitar (track 1)
 Michael Landau – acoustic and electric guitar (track 3)
 Ruslan Sirota – piano (tracks 1, 9 and 12), keyboards (tracks 1–3, 5)
 Phil Davis – keyboards (track 8)
 Ronald Bruner, Jr. – drums (tracks 1, 2, 5, 7–9, 12)
 Paulinho Da Costa – percussion (track 9)
 Esperanza Spalding – vocals (tracks 1, 5)

Production
 Producer: Stanley Clarke
 Executive producer: Dave Love
 Recording engineers: Gerry "The Gov" Brown and Ed Thacker
 Mastering: Bernie Grundman
 Album design: Robert Hoffman
 Cover photo: Armando Carlos

References

External links 
 Stanley Clarke - The Toys of Men (2007) album review by Jeff Tamarkin, credits & releases at AllMusic
 Stanley Clarke - The Toys of Men (2007) album releases & credits at Discogs
 Stanley Clarke - The Toys of Men (2007) album credits & user reviews at ProgArchives.com
 Stanley Clarke - The Toys of Men (2007) album to be listened as stream on Spotify

2007 albums
Stanley Clarke albums
Heads Up International albums
Albums produced by Stanley Clarke